A Muralha may refer to:

 A Muralha (1968 TV series), a Brazilian telenovela
 A Muralha (2000 TV series), a Brazilian historical fiction television series